Banca Popolare di Sondrio S.C.p.A. (BPSO) is an Italian bank based in Sondrio, Lombardy. The company was included in FTSE Italia Mid Cap Index.

History
Banca Popolare di Sondrio was an urban cooperative bank found in 1871. Along with Credito Valtellinese, they were the major banks inside the Province of Sondrio.

The bank also owned equity interests in several companies that provide services to the bank, such as Banca Italease (4.252% on 30 June 2009), Arca Vita and Istituto Centrale delle Banche Popolari Italiane (2%).

In 2009–11 Banca Italease was dismantled. BPSO acquired 20.95% stake in Alba Leasing as well as 60.5% stake in Factorit.

Due to Decree-Law N°3/2015, the bank would be demutualized. However, it was held due to an appeal to the court.

In September 2017 the bank announced that, they acquired Banca della Nuova Terra.

Equity interests
 ARCA SGR

References

External links
 

Companies based in Sondrio
Banks established in 1871
Italian companies established in 1871
Cooperative banks of Italy
Banks under direct supervision of the European Central Bank